Bjerkandera fumosa  is a species of poroid fungus in the family Meruliaceae.

Taxonomy
It was first described to science as Boletus fumosus by Christiaan Hendrik Persoon in 1801. Petter Adolf Karsten transferred the species to the genus Bjerkandera in 1879.

Description
The form of Bjerkandera fumosa fruit bodies ranges from effused-reflexed (spread out over the substrate and turned back at the margin to form a cap) or cap-like, but attached directly to the substrate without a stipe. These caps can be solitary or closely overlapping, and are often fused with neighbouring caps. The pores on the cap underside are circular to angular, numbering 2–5 per millimetre.

Bjerkandera fumosa has a monomitic hyphal system, containing only generative hyphae. The basidia are club-shaped, measuring 20–22 μm. Spores have the shape of short cylinders, and measure 5.5–7 by 2.5–3.5 μm. They are smooth, hyaline, and do not react with Melzer's reagent.

Habitat and distribution
Bjerkandera fumosa causes a white rot in various hardwood species. It has a circumboreal distribution in the Northern Hemisphere.

References

Meruliaceae
Fungi of Asia
Fungi of Europe
Fungi of North America
Fungal plant pathogens and diseases
Fungi described in 1801
Taxa named by Christiaan Hendrik Persoon